Paltik is a Filipino term for a homemade gun. It is usually manufactured using scrap metal and angle iron. These homemade weapons are usually manufactured in Danao, Cebu, where the production of replicas of known firearms is a cottage industry. The manufacturers claim to be able to replicate any gun, although they prefer to mass-produce six-cylinder .38 caliber  revolvers. The Philippine government notes that these firearms are of low quality, even if some are considered as "Class A" or high quality. Danao has the most concentration of factories since the 1940s, but paltik production can also be found in Negros, Leyte, and Mindanao. The Moro Islamic Liberation Front were also known to produce paltik but were unable to upscale their production due to government pressure.

The paltik suffered from poor accuracy and low quality firing mechanisms. Some lacked grooves in its bore, making its shots inaccurate. Due to poor craftsmanship, the weapon was more dangerous to the shooter than the target. Some Filipino gunsmiths however, did make reliable percussion cap rifles that functioned in a manner similar to a 19th-century musket.

Paltiks are still being made illegally in the Philippines today. These were being registered during the administration of President Corazon Aquino but this "legalization" was revoked and all registered paltiks had to be surrendered to the government. President Gloria Macapagal Arroyo signed Executive Order No. 171 in  2003 which prohibits paltiks from being licensed.

The paltik is effectively a ghost gun; an unregistered weapon bearing no serial numbers. High quality replicas of .45 caliber semi-automatic pistols have been recorded being made in the Philippines and ending up in the United States black market.

See also
 Ghost gun
 Improvised firearm
 Gun industry in Danao

References

Philippine–American War
Homemade firearms
Insurgency weapons